The Russian Institute of Theatre Arts (GITIS) is the largest and oldest independent theatrical arts school in Russia. Located in Moscow, the school was founded on 22 September 1878 as the Shostakovsky Music School. It became the School of Music and Drama of the Moscow Philharmonic Society in 1883, was elevated to the status of a conservatory in 1886, was renamed the Institute of Music and Drama in 1918, and was known as the Lunacharsky State Institute for Theatre Arts (GITIS) from 1934 to 1991.

Mission and background
GITIS trains students in various professions in the theatrical arts (including ballet, acting, etc.) and simultaneously provides a traditional university education in liberal arts and humanities. Approximately 1,500 students, qualification-advancement students, and post-graduate students from various countries study at GITIS.

History

Nineteenth century
The university was founded as the Shestakovskiy Music School for Coming People in Moscow at the end of the 19th century, patronized by the Society of Musical and Dramatic Arts Lovers. In 1883 the Society was renamed the Moscow Philharmonic Society and the school obtained the status of Specialized School of Music and Drama, subordinated by the Society. They were under the patronage of Grand Duke Nikolai. Subsequently, the School has been equal in the rights to higher educational institutions – conservatories that has been fixed by the new charter approved by Emperor under the petition of Great Princess Elizabeth Fedorovna.

Drama classes of the musical-drama school were headed by well known actors, teachers and theatrical figures such as Alexander Yuzhin (1883–1889), Osyp Pravdin (1889–1891) and Vladimir Nemirovich-Danchenko (1891–1901). The 1898 class graduates included Olga Knipper, Margarita Savitskaya, and Vsevolod Meyerhold.

Twentieth century
In 1902, the school moved into the antique Soldatenkov Family building at Maly Kislovsky, where it has been located since. On 24 October 1903 "The Charter of Musical-Drama School of the Moscow Philharmonic Society under the protection of Her Imperial Highness Princess Elisaveta Fedorovna" was approved. According to the Charter, the School was a department of the Ministry of Internal Affairs.

The acclaimed masters of Russian Musical culture as Rodolph Erlikh, Serge Koussevitsky and Erdely taught at the school. The graduates of the school at that time were composer Vasily Kalinnikov and a great Russian opera singer Leonid Sobinov. The tradition of drama classes to finish training by performance was also acquired by musical classes where opera performances were staged, and also programs of a student's symphonic orchestra. Skill of young musicians has allowed to act accompanied by this orchestra of Pablo de Sarasate, to Sergei Rachmaninoff, Leonid Sobinov, Feodor Chaliapin, Anton Arensky, and others.

Since the Revolution in Russia of 1917, the Musical-Drama School has undergone a number of reorganization and changes of names caused by reforms in the state education system.

In August 1922, the school was renamed the State Institute of Musical Drama and was joined with Vsevolod Meyerhold's State Theatrical Workshops. This association received the name of State Institute of Theatrical Art – GITIS. The official date of its formation was 17 September 1922. According to the original plan GITIS was meant to unite three major branches of theatrical arts: drama, opera and choreography.

In June 1923, the State Practical Institute of Choreography joined GITIS as a separate department and the plan was achieved. Three departments were organized: drama( A. Petrovsky – dean), opera (Konstantin Saradzhev – dean ) and choreography (N. Rakhmanov – dean).  In 1924, the existing theatrical institutes of Moscow and St.Petersburg were closed by Sovnarkom Edict because ... "of failures in the quality of theatrical education," but in spite of this, GITIS was authorized to graduate students in the accelerated manner. Clubs by interests and the club movement actively developed those years, were the main stimulus for the subsequent creation of theatrically instructor classes on the basis of already disbanded GITIS. In 1925 the Central technical school of a theatrical art (CETETIS) an educational institution with the four-year training was created.

In 1926, on the basis of graduates of GITIS and CETETIS theatre, Musical Drama in Zamoskvorechye has been generated. As a logic end of this process was an opening of directing-pedagogical faculty on September, 15th, 1930. The faculty began to prepare directors, heads of professional theaters, large working clubs, palaces of culture and acting teachers. It was the first-ever experience of vocational training of directors. GITIS today is still the recognized leader in this area.

On 2 August 1931 by decision of Sovnarkom RSFSR "About reorganization of system of art education in RSFSR", regulated activity of art higher educational institutions has been published. And on 1 October of the same year the theatrical high school was created by Sovnarkom order which has received the name already familiar to all – GITIS. In 1931 for the first time in Europe higher school preparation of experts in the field of the organization of theatrical business has begun – the management faculty which has existed up to 1939. In 1931, the theater critics faculty has been organized with classes of Russian and West-European theater history. Three more years after the second opening GITIS existed as part of Theatrical Combine.

In July 1935 Theatrical Combine again transformed to the State Institute of Theatrical Art with three faculties: production management (with three years training), directing (with four years training), acting (with four years training). The Faculty of those years in GITIS were such known theatrical figures as Serafima Birman, Leonid Baratov, Boris Mordvinov, Boris Sushkevich, Leonid Leonidov, Mikhail Tarkhanov, Vasily Sakhnovsky, Olga Pyzhova, Boris Bibikov, Olga Androvskaya, Yosif Raevsky, Vasily Orlov, Andrey Lobanov, Mikhail Astangov, Ilya Sudakov, Yury Zavadsky.

World War Two
After the beginning of Second World War in September – October 1941 the education process in GITIS has been temporarily stopped. GITIS students were evacuated from Moscow to Saratov on 23 October.
The GITIS Front Theater was organized out of acting and directing faculties graduates in the summer of 1942 in Saratov. It made its contribution to a movement of front theaters in Second World War. For one thousand four hundred eighteen days of war the theater has given more than one thousand and five hundred performances.
Many GITIS graduates, students and teachers were fighting at several fronts. Many of them had been honored with high military awards, including a Hero of the USSR, which N. Kachuevskaya was honored post-mortem.

Post-war years
In post-war years GITIS is widely growing. Few new faculties were organized. On August, 5th, 1946 the directing faculty stepped forward with the new initiative, to open at faculty three branches: opera, directing and ballet. The opera branch has been transformed all over again to branch of musical theater directing. Then the faculty of musical theater has been created.

In 1946 faculty of a choreography has been created. Since 1958 GITIS Educational Theater was opened.  GITIS Theater well known for many theater productions and playing the major role in preparation of students for all theatrical specialties. In 1964, the directing faculty begun to prepare a variety show directors and in 1973 the variety directing faculty was organized.  The founder and a head of the faculty was Igor Sharoev. In 1975, the faculty of a circus art is created. In 1974 has found the second life the producer's faculty, set as to itself the purpose formation of highly skilled managers of a wide structure, not only for theaters but also for TV, show business, cinema and circus. In 1992 the faculty of scenography was opened.

In 1991, the status of academy has been given to GITIS, and Institute has been renamed into the Russian Academy of Theater Arts – GITIS. Traditions of academy is in continuity.

Present day
Today the Russian University of Theatre Arts (GITIS) is integrated into the world system of theatrical education. Its partners are theatrical schools of Great Britain (Middlesex University, the Guildhall School of Music and Drama and East 15 Acting School in London), France (the National Conservatory of Drama Art in Paris, the Higher National School of Theatrical Art in Lyon), Holland (Theatrical academy in Amsterdam), Germany (the International Theatrical Center in Berlin), Israel (Theatrical school Beit-Tsvi), Italy (Silvio De Amiko Academy of Drama Art in Rome), United States (Colgate University, Cornell University) and more.

There are 8 faculties at the Russian University of Theatre Arts (GITIS). At each faculty there are department(s) corresponding to the specialisation of students' training. Besides, there are 9 inter-faculty departments to provide students with all-round education in the performing arts and the humanities. Upon completion of the full-time Graduate Course at a chosen faculty the student receives a diploma of higher education at Russian University of  Theatre Arts (GITIS) with a Master's qualification in the applicable speciality in the Arts.

The main principle "student-teacher-student" is the main criterion in selection of the teaching staff, therefore many teachers of the university today are graduates of the GITIS.

Alumni
 Zina Andri one of the Albanian National Theater founders, in 1950 becomes the first female stage and theater director of the Albanian Theater, born Zinaida Andrejenko in Kharkiv, Ukraine
 Igor Korošec, actor, theorist, professor of acting
 Jurij Alschitz, theatre director, theorist
 Dmitry Bertman, theatre and opera director
 Mikhail Butkevich, theatre director, theorist
 Anatoly Efros, theatre director
 Pyotr Fomenko, theatre director
 Simion Ghimpu, writer and lyricist
 Jerzy Grotowski, theatre director, theorist
 Angel Gutierrez, niño de Rusia, theater director and actor, founder of Chekhov Theatre in Madrid, one of the most important popularizers of Chekhov in Spain.
 Tankho Israelov, dancer, choreographer
 Chulpan Khamatova, actress
 Alim Kouliev, actor and theatre director
 Savely Kramarov, actor
 Lev Leshchenko, actor and singer
 Māris Liepa, ballet dancer
 Olga Lyubimova, Minister of Culture for the Russian Federation since January 2020
 Alexandre Marine, actor and theatre director
 Eimuntas Nekrošius, theatre director
 Elena Nikolaeva (actress)
 Alla Pugacheva, musical performer
 Tatiana Samoilova, actress
 Larisa Sinelshchikova, media manager and producer
Tatyana Shmyga, singer and actress
 Georgy Tovstonogov, theatre director
 Anatoly Vasiliev, theatre director
 Roman Viktyuk, theater director, actor, screenwriter
 Mark Zakharov, theater and film director
 Andrey Zvyagintsev, actor and film director
Skënder Selimi, Albanian ballet master, choreographer and professor.
Mariya Fomina, actress

References

Sources
 A. Yu. Smoliakov Тот самый ГИТИС. – (Moscow: Алгоритм-Книга, 2004. – 288 p.) – .

External links

 GITIS International 
 Russian Education. GITIS 

Drama schools in Russia
Education in Moscow
Academies of arts
Russian Academy of Arts
Russian National Academies
Educational institutions established in 1878
1878 establishments in the Russian Empire
Cultural heritage monuments of regional significance in Moscow